Bunji is a masculine Japanese given name. Notable people with the name include:

Bunji Garlin, a musician from Trinidad and Tobago
Bunji Kimura (1944), Japanese footballer and coach
Bruce Bunji Kuwabara (1950), Canadian architect
Okazaki Bunji, creator of Japan's first stored-program computer FUJIC
Bunji Sakita (1930-2002),  Japanese-American theoretical physicist
, Japanese politician
Haruo Minami (1923-2001), Japanese singer (birth name Bunji Kitazume)

Fictional characters
Bunji Kugeshira, a character in the videogame Gungrave
Bunji, a plush orange hamster-like rabbit in The Chica Show
Bunjiro "Bunji" Bennett, a character in the animated TV series Bionic Six

See also
 Bunji (disambiguation)

Japanese masculine given names